This is the discography of British rock singer and songwriter Graham Bonnet, both as a solo artist and as a band member.

Albums

Studio albums

Live albums

Compilations

Singles

Album appearances (guest sessions)

References

Discographies of British artists
Rock music discographies